Spalding High School (SHS) is a grammar school for girls and a mixed sixth form located in Spalding, Lincolnshire, England.

Location and admissions
Spalding High School, situated on Stonegate, Spalding, halfway between the Welland (and B1173) and the Coronation Channel to the east. The rear of the school, to the east, backs onto Exeter Drain and both of the Gleed schools (boys' and girls') playing fields. The school also accepts some girls from Cambridgeshire, Peterborough and Norfolk.

SHS admits pupils aged 11–18, all of whom are required to pass an 11+ exam. There are approximately 1,000 staff and students at the school. The headmistress is Michele Anderson.

History
The school opened in 1920, originally at Ayscoughfee Hall School, then moved to its current site in the late 1950s. There are a number of watercolours of the original site in the school's collection, as well as all full school photos (taken once every five years) dating back to the school's early days. The library keeps an archive of photos, programmes and other memorabilia.

In the 1960s and 1970s, the school's playing field was frequently used for national and regional schools' hockey competitions. It achieved sports college status in 2003.

Houses
In a typical year group at SHS there are five forms of approximately 30 pupils. Each form is a member of a house. There are five houses, each named after famous women of historic importance:

 Curie - after Marie Curie (physicist)
 Johnson - after Amy Johnson (aviator)
 Nightingale - after Florence Nightingale (medicine)
 Pankhurst - after Emmeline Pankhurst (women's rights)
 Sharman - after Helen Sharman (astronaut)

Notable former pupils

 Christine Russell (1956–63) - Labour MP 1997-2010 for City of Chester, who unseated Gyles Brandreth in 1997.

Notable former teachers
 Jenny Randerson, Baroness Randerson (1972-4 history) - Life peer, former education spokesperson for LibDems in the Welsh Assembly.

See also
 Spalding Grammar School -  a school for boys, but accepts girls into the sixth form.

References

External links
 Spalding High School

Girls' schools in Lincolnshire
Grammar schools in Lincolnshire
Educational institutions established in 1920
Spalding, Lincolnshire
1920 establishments in England
Community schools in Lincolnshire